This is a list of 432 species in Pteromalus, a genus of pteromalids in the family Pteromalidae.

Pteromalus species

 Pteromalus aartseni (Gijswijt, 1972) c g
 Pteromalus abdominalis Statz, 1938 c g
 Pteromalus aberrans Forster, 1841 g
 Pteromalus abieticola Ratzeburg, 1848 c g
 Pteromalus achillei Janzon, 1984 c g
 Pteromalus acicularis Forster, 1841 g
 Pteromalus actinopterae (Hedqvist, 1977) c g
 Pteromalus acuminatus Forster, 1841 g
 Pteromalus aeneus Fonscolombe, 1832 c g
 Pteromalus aerosus Statz, 1938 c g
 Pteromalus aeson Walker, 1848 c g
 Pteromalus agilis Forster, 1841 g
 Pteromalus albescens Ratzeburg, 1844 c g
 Pteromalus albidovenosus Walker, 1874 c g
 Pteromalus albipennis Walker, 1835 c g
 Pteromalus albitarsis De Stefani, 1907 c g
 Pteromalus almeriensis Gijswijt, 1999 c g
 Pteromalus alternans Forster, 1841 g
 Pteromalus alternipes Walker, 1872 c g
 Pteromalus altus (Walker, 1834) c g
 Pteromalus amabilis Walker, 1836 c g
 Pteromalus amage (Walker, 1849) c g
 Pteromalus ambiguus Forster, 1841 g
 Pteromalus amerinae Swederus, 1795 c g
 Pteromalus ametrus Graham, 1981 g
 Pteromalus amyntor Walker, 1846 c g
 Pteromalus anaxis Walker, 1849 c g
 Pteromalus angustus Forster, 1841 g
 Pteromalus annae Janzon, 1984 c g
 Pteromalus anomalipes Forster, 1841 g
 Pteromalus antheraecola Amerling & Kirchner, 1860 c g
 Pteromalus apantelesi Risbec, 1952 c g
 Pteromalus apantelophagus (Crawford, 1910) c g
 Pteromalus apicalis Nees, 1834 c g
 Pteromalus apionis (Goureau, 1847) c g
 Pteromalus apum (Retzius, 1783) c g
 Pteromalus arborivagus Forster, 1841 g
 Pteromalus archia Walker, 1843 c g
 Pteromalus arnicae Janzon, 1984 c g
 Pteromalus atomos Fonscolombe, 1832 c g
 Pteromalus atomus Statz, 1938 c g
 Pteromalus atra Statz, 1938 c g
 Pteromalus atramentarius Forster, 1841 g
 Pteromalus aurantiacus Ratzeburg, 1852 c g
 Pteromalus auratus Swederus, 1795 c g
 Pteromalus aureolus (Thomson, 1878) c g
 Pteromalus aurifacies Forster, 1841 g
 Pteromalus aurinitens Forster, 1841 g
 Pteromalus barycerus Forster, 1841 g
 Pteromalus baton Walker, 1839 c g
 Pteromalus bedeguaris (Thomson, 1878) c g
 Pteromalus bekiliensis Risbec, 1952 c g
 Pteromalus berylli Walker, 1835 c g
 Pteromalus bienna Walker, 1848 c g
 Pteromalus bifoveolatus Förster, 1861 g
 Pteromalus blandus Forster, 1841 g
 Pteromalus bottnicus Vikberg, 1979 c g
 Pteromalus brachygaster (Graham, 1969) c g
 Pteromalus breviscapus Forster, 1841 g
 Pteromalus brunnicans Ratzeburg, 1848 c g
 Pteromalus bryce Walker, 1842 c g
 Pteromalus calenus Walker, 1843 c g
 Pteromalus canariensis (Janzon, 1977) c g
 Pteromalus capreae (Linnaeus, 1761) c g
 Pteromalus cardui (Erdos, 1953) g
 Pteromalus carinatus Forster, 1841 g
 Pteromalus cassotis Walker, 1847 c g b
 Pteromalus caudiger (Graham, 1969) c g
 Pteromalus cerealellae (Ashmead, 1902) c g
 Pteromalus cerinopus Forster, 1841 g
 Pteromalus chalybaeus Nees, 1834 c g
 Pteromalus chlorogaster (Thomson, 1878) c g
 Pteromalus chlorospilus (Walker, 1834) c g
 Pteromalus chrysis Forster, 1841 g
 Pteromalus chrysos Walker, 1836 c g
 Pteromalus ciliatus Walker, 1795 c g
 Pteromalus cioni (Thomson, 1878) c g
 Pteromalus cionobius (Erdos, 1953) g
 Pteromalus clavicornis Swederus, 1795 c g
 Pteromalus clavipes Forster, 1841 g
 Pteromalus cleophanes Walker, 1839 c g
 Pteromalus coeruleiventris (Ashmead, 1888) c g
 Pteromalus coerulescens Ratzeburg, 1852 c g
 Pteromalus coeruleus Forster, 1841 g
 Pteromalus coloradensis (Ashmead, 1890) c g
 Pteromalus colosseus Forster, 1841 g
 Pteromalus compactus Forster, 1841 g
 Pteromalus compos Forster, 1841 g
 Pteromalus concinnus Forster, 1841 g
 Pteromalus conformis (Graham, 1969) c g
 Pteromalus conoideus Ratzeburg, 1848 c g
 Pteromalus conopidarum (Boucek, 1961) c g
 Pteromalus cosis Walker, 1839 c g
 Pteromalus costulata Gijswijt, 1999 c g
 Pteromalus couridae Cameron, 1913 c g
 Pteromalus crassicapitatus Statz, 1938 c g
 Pteromalus crassicornis Zetterstedt, 1838 c g
 Pteromalus crassinervis (Thomson, 1878) c g
 Pteromalus crassus Forster, 1841 g
 Pteromalus cryptocephali Ratzeburg, 1852 c g
 Pteromalus cubocephalus Forster, 1841 g
 Pteromalus cupreus Nees, 1834 c g
 Pteromalus curculionoides (Bouché, 1834) g
 Pteromalus cylindraceus Forster, 1841 g
 Pteromalus cyniphidis (Linnaeus, 1758) g
 Pteromalus dahlbomi Ratzeburg, 1844 c g
 Pteromalus dalmanni Forster, 1841 g
 Pteromalus damo Walker, 1847 c g
 Pteromalus decipiens (Graham, 1969) c
 Pteromalus defossus Statz, 1938 c g
 Pteromalus delvarei Vago, 2002 c g
 Pteromalus dendrolimi Matsumura, 1926 c g
 Pteromalus depressus Forster, 1841 g
 Pteromalus devorator Forster, 1841 g
 Pteromalus diadema Ratzeburg, 1852 c g
 Pteromalus diatatus Schmidt, 1851 c g
 Pteromalus difficilis Forster, 1841 g
 Pteromalus dimiduis Dalla Torre, 1898 c g
 Pteromalus diminuator Forster, 1841 g
 Pteromalus dirutor Forster, 1841 g
 Pteromalus discors Graham, 1992 c g
 Pteromalus discrepans Forster, 1861 g
 Pteromalus dispar (Curtis, 1827) c g
 Pteromalus divitissimus Dalla Torre, 1898 c g
 Pteromalus dolichurus (Thomson, 1878) c g
 Pteromalus doryssus Walker, 1847 c g
 Pteromalus doumeti Fairmaire, 1879 c g
 Pteromalus driopides Walker, 1839 c g
 Pteromalus ecarinatus Forster, 1841 g
 Pteromalus egregius Forster, 1841 g
 Pteromalus elatus Forster, 1841 g
 Pteromalus elevatus (Walker, 1834) c g
 Pteromalus ellisorum Gijswijt, 1984 c g
 Pteromalus elongatus Ratzeburg, 1852 c g
 Pteromalus elpinice Walker, 1839 c g
 Pteromalus eminens Forster, 1841 g
 Pteromalus epicles Walker, 1847 c g
 Pteromalus epimelas Walker, 1836 c g
 Pteromalus esuriens Forster, 1841 g
 Pteromalus eurymi Gahan, 1913 c g
 Pteromalus euthymus Walker, 1847 c g
 Pteromalus euurae Askew, 1995 c g
 Pteromalus exanimis Brues, 1910 c g
 Pteromalus exiguus Forster, 1841 g
 Pteromalus exoletus Forster, 1841 g
 Pteromalus exsertus Forster, 1841 g
 Pteromalus extensus Forster, 1841 g
 Pteromalus fabia Walker, 1839 c g
 Pteromalus facilis Forster, 1841 g
 Pteromalus fagi Ratzeburg, 1852 c g
 Pteromalus fasciatus (Thomson, 1878) c
 Pteromalus faunigena Forster, 1841 g
 Pteromalus felginas Walker, 1842 c g
 Pteromalus fenomenalis (Domenichini, 1958) g
 Pteromalus ferox Forster, 1841 g
 Pteromalus fervidus Forster, 1841 g
 Pteromalus festivus Forster, 1841 g
 Pteromalus flavicornis (Girault & Dodd, 1915) c g
 Pteromalus flavipalpis Ratzeburg, 1844 c g
 Pteromalus flaviscapus Rudow, 1886 c g
 Pteromalus flaviventris Rudow, 1886 c g
 Pteromalus foersteri Dalla Torre, 1898 g
 Pteromalus fugax Forster, 1841 g
 Pteromalus furtivus Forster, 1841 g
 Pteromalus fuscipennis (Walker, 1834) c g
 Pteromalus fuscipes (Provancher, 1881) c g
 Pteromalus fuscitarsis Ashmead, 1901 c g
 Pteromalus fuscopalpus Forster, 1841 g
 Pteromalus gallicolus Doganlar, 1980 c g
 Pteromalus garibaldius (Girault, 1938) c g
 Pteromalus genuinus Forster, 1841 g
 Pteromalus glabriculus (Thomson, 1878) c g
 Pteromalus gnavis Forster, 1841 g
 Pteromalus gracillimus Dalla Torre, 1898 c g
 Pteromalus gratiosus Forster, 1841 g
 Pteromalus grisselli  g
 Pteromalus gryneus Walker, 1842 c g
 Pteromalus guttula Ratzeburg, 1852 c g
 Pteromalus habilis Forster, 1841 g
 Pteromalus hedymeles Walker, 1839 c g
 Pteromalus helenomus (Graham, 1969) c g
 Pteromalus hemileucae Gahan, 1917 c g
 Pteromalus herbaceus Forster, 1841 g
 Pteromalus hercyniae Ratzeburg, 1844 c g
 Pteromalus hesus Walker, 1839 c g
 Pteromalus hieracii (Thomson, 1878) c g
 Pteromalus hirtipes Statz, 1938 c g
 Pteromalus holmgrenii Dalla Torre, 1898 c g
 Pteromalus honestus Forster, 1841 g
 Pteromalus hunteri (Crawford, 1908) c g
 Pteromalus hyalopterus Dalla Torre, 1898 c g
 Pteromalus hypocyaneus Forster, 1841 g
 Pteromalus hyponomeutae (Masi, 1909) g
 Pteromalus ignobilis Forster, 1861 g
 Pteromalus illustratus Forster, 1841 g
 Pteromalus immundus Forster, 1841 g
 Pteromalus impeditus Walker, 1835 c g
 Pteromalus impressifrons Forster, 1841 g
 Pteromalus inanis Forster, 1841 g
 Pteromalus incertus Forster, 1841 g
 Pteromalus inclytus Forster, 1841 g
 Pteromalus inconspicuus Forster, 1841 g
 Pteromalus inermis Forster, 1841 g
 Pteromalus infelix Dalla Torre, 1898 c g
 Pteromalus infestus Forster, 1841 g
 Pteromalus infinitus Forster, 1841 g
 Pteromalus inquilinus Forster, 1841 g
 Pteromalus insignis Forster, 1841 g
 Pteromalus integer Walker, 1872 c g
 Pteromalus intermedius (Walker, 1834) c g
 Pteromalus ipsea Walker, 1839 c g
 Pteromalus isarchus Walker, 1839 c g
 Pteromalus ivondroi Risbec, 1952 c g
 Pteromalus janssoni (Graham, 1969) c g
 Pteromalus jejunus Forster, 1841 g
 Pteromalus keralensis Sureshan, 2001 c g
 Pteromalus kuwayamae Matsumura, 1926 c g
 Pteromalus lactucae (Szelenyi & Erdos, 1953) g
 Pteromalus laetus Forster, 1841 g
 Pteromalus laevis Forster, 1841 g
 Pteromalus laricinellae Ratzeburg, 1848 c g
 Pteromalus larymna Walker, 1848 c g
 Pteromalus larzacensis Graham, 1984 c g
 Pteromalus latipennatus Statz, 1938 c g
 Pteromalus latreillei Ratzeburg, 1848 c g
 Pteromalus lazulinus Forster, 1841 g
 Pteromalus lepidotus Ratzeburg, 1852 c g
 Pteromalus leptogaster Forster, 1841 g
 Pteromalus leptostictus Forster, 1841 g
 Pteromalus leucanthemi Janzon, 1980 c g
 Pteromalus limbatus Forster, 1841 g
 Pteromalus lineolatus Dalla Torre, 1898 c g
 Pteromalus lixi (Sarra, 1924) g
 Pteromalus longicornis Statz, 1938 c g
 Pteromalus lugens Forster, 1841 g
 Pteromalus lutulentus Dalla Torre, 1898 c g
 Pteromalus luzonensis Gahan, 1925 c g
 Pteromalus macrocerus Dalla Torre, 1898 c g
 Pteromalus macronychivorus Perez, 1864 c g
 Pteromalus maculiscapus Ratzeburg, 1844 c g
 Pteromalus mandibulatus Dalla Torre, 1898 c g
 Pteromalus marellii De Santis, 1998 c g
 Pteromalus mariae Dalla Torre, 1898 c g
 Pteromalus matsuyadorii Matsumura, 1926 c g
 Pteromalus maurus Forster, 1841 g
 Pteromalus mediocris Walker, 1835 c g
 Pteromalus megareus Walker, 1842 c g
 Pteromalus melancholicus Forster, 1841 g
 Pteromalus melanocerus Forster, 1841 g
 Pteromalus melanochlorus Forster, 1841 g
 Pteromalus meridionalis Risbec, 1952 c g
 Pteromalus metallicus Sureshan, 2001 c g
 Pteromalus metallifemur (Bukovskii, 1938) g
 Pteromalus microgastris (Kurdjumov, 1912) g
 Pteromalus microneurus Ratzeburg, 1844 c g
 Pteromalus microps (Graham, 1969) c g
 Pteromalus micros Dalla Torre, 1898 c g
 Pteromalus mixtus Forster, 1841 g
 Pteromalus mobilis Forster, 1841 g
 Pteromalus molestus Forster, 1841 g
 Pteromalus monochrous Forster, 1841 g
 Pteromalus moravicus Graham, 1984 c g
 Pteromalus musaeus Walker, 1844 c g
 Pteromalus mutia Walker, 1839 c g
 Pteromalus mydon Walker, 1839 c g
 Pteromalus myopitae (Graham, 1969) c g
 Pteromalus myopites De Stefani Perez, 1901 c g
 Pteromalus nanulus Dalla Torre, 1898 c g
 Pteromalus napaeus Forster, 1841 g
 Pteromalus naucus Forster, 1841 g
 Pteromalus navis Ratzeburg, 1848 c g
 Pteromalus nebulosus Dalla Torre, 1898 c g
 Pteromalus neesii Ratzeburg, 1844 c g
 Pteromalus neglectus Forster, 1841 g
 Pteromalus niger (Fonscolombe, 1832) c g
 Pteromalus nigricans Forster, 1841 g
 Pteromalus nigrus Sureshan, 2001 c g
 Pteromalus niphe Walker, 1839 c g
 Pteromalus nodulosus Ratzeburg, 1848 c g
 Pteromalus nuperus Forster, 1841 g
 Pteromalus obductus Forster, 1841 g
 Pteromalus obscurus Nees, 1834 c
 Pteromalus obvolitans Forster, 1841 g
 Pteromalus ochrocerus (Thomson, 1878) c g
 Pteromalus oenoe Walker, 1843 c g
 Pteromalus onerati Fitch, 1859 c g
 Pteromalus opacus Forster, 1841 g
 Pteromalus opimus Forster, 1841 g
 Pteromalus ormenus Walker, 1839 c g
 Pteromalus ornatus Forster, 1841 g
 Pteromalus ortalus Walker, 1839 c g
 Pteromalus osmiae Hedqvist, 1979 c g
 Pteromalus oxynthes Walker, 1843 c g
 Pteromalus pachygaster Forster, 1841 g
 Pteromalus pachymerus Forster, 1841 g
 Pteromalus pallipes (Spinola, 1808) c g
 Pteromalus paludicola Boucek, 1972 c g
 Pteromalus papaveris Forster, 1841 g
 Pteromalus parietinae (Graham, 1969) c g
 Pteromalus patro Walker, 1848 c g
 Pteromalus pellucidiventris Ratzeburg, 1848 c g
 Pteromalus pellucidus Forster, 1841 g
 Pteromalus phycidis (Ashmead, 1898) c g
 Pteromalus picinus Forster, 1841 g
 Pteromalus pilosellae Janzon, 1984 c g
 Pteromalus pilosellus Forster, 1841 g
 Pteromalus planiusculus Forster, 1841 g
 Pteromalus platyphilus Walker, 1874 c g
 Pteromalus pogonochoeri Ratzeburg, 1844 c g
 Pteromalus poisoensis Graham, 1983 c g
 Pteromalus polychlori Ratzeburg, 1852 c g
 Pteromalus polycyclus Forster, 1841 g
 Pteromalus pomacearum Ratzeburg, 1852 c g
 Pteromalus pontaniae Askew, 1985 c g
 Pteromalus praeceps Forster, 1841 g
 Pteromalus praecocellae (Boucek, 1967) c g
 Pteromalus praelongus Forster, 1841 g
 Pteromalus praepes Forster, 1841 g
 Pteromalus praepotens Forster, 1841 g
 Pteromalus princeps Forster, 1841 g
 Pteromalus procerus Graham, 1969 c g
 Pteromalus propinquus Forster, 1841 g
 Pteromalus proprius Walker, 1874 c g
 Pteromalus provincialis Graham, 1984 g
 Pteromalus psyllus Forster, 1841 g
 Pteromalus pulchellus Statz, 1938 c g
 Pteromalus pullus Forster, 1841 g
 Pteromalus punctum Forster, 1841 g
 Pteromalus pungens Forster, 1841 g
 Pteromalus puparum (Linnaeus, 1758) c g
 Pteromalus purpureiventris (Ashmead, 1888) c g
 Pteromalus pygmaeanae Ratzeburg, 1844 c g
 Pteromalus pygmaeolus Statz, 1938 c g
 Pteromalus pygmaeus Forster, 1841 g
 Pteromalus qinghaiensis Liao, 1987 c g
 Pteromalus questionis Forster, 1841 g
 Pteromalus racemosi Ratzeburg, 1848 c g
 Pteromalus ramulorum Ratzeburg, 1848 c g
 Pteromalus rapax Forster, 1841 g
 Pteromalus ratzeburgii Dalla Torre, 1898 c g
 Pteromalus rectispinus Statz, 1938 c g
 Pteromalus regius Forster, 1841 g
 Pteromalus relevatus Forster, 1841 g
 Pteromalus rhinthon Walker, 1844 c g
 Pteromalus rhoebus Walker, 1843 c g
 Pteromalus rhombicus Forster, 1841 g
 Pteromalus ridens Vago, 2002 c g
 Pteromalus rondanii Dalla Torre, 1898 c g
 Pteromalus rottensis Statz, 1938 c g
 Pteromalus rudowii Dalla Torre, 1898 c g
 Pteromalus ruficornis Rudow, 1886 c g
 Pteromalus saltatorius Forster, 1841 g
 Pteromalus sapphireus Forster, 1841 g
 Pteromalus scandiae (Graham, 1969) c g
 Pteromalus semotus (Walker, 1834) c g
 Pteromalus senegalensis Risbec, 1951 c g
 Pteromalus sequester Walker, 1835 c g
 Pteromalus serratae Graham, 1984 c g
 Pteromalus sestius Walker, 1843 c g
 Pteromalus shanxiensis Huang, 1987 c g
 Pteromalus similis Forster, 1841 g
 Pteromalus simplex Forster, 1841 g
 Pteromalus sincerus Forster, 1841 g
 Pteromalus singularis Forster, 1841 g
 Pteromalus smaragdinus Forster, 1841 g
 Pteromalus smaragdus Graham, 1969 c g
 Pteromalus solidaginis Graham & Gijswijt, 1991 c g
 Pteromalus solidus Forster, 1841 g
 Pteromalus sonchi Janzon, 1983 c g
 Pteromalus sophax Walker, 1839 c g
 Pteromalus sparsus Forster, 1841 g
 Pteromalus speculifer Graham, 1981 c g
 Pteromalus sphaerogaster Forster, 1841 g
 Pteromalus sphegigaster De Stefani, 1886 c g
 Pteromalus spilocerus Dalla Torre, 1898 c g
 Pteromalus splendidus Forster, 1841 g
 Pteromalus spoliator Forster, 1861 g
 Pteromalus squamifer Thomson, 1878 c g
 Pteromalus strobilobius Ratzeburg, 1852 c g
 Pteromalus subaequalis Forster, 1841 g
 Pteromalus sublaevis Forster, 1841 g
 Pteromalus subpunctatus Forster, 1841 g
 Pteromalus subterraneus Forster, 1841 g
 Pteromalus suia Walker, 1848 c g
 Pteromalus sulphuripes Forster, 1841 g
 Pteromalus sybarita Forster, 1841 g
 Pteromalus sylvarum Forster, 1841 g
 Pteromalus sylveni Hedqvist, 1979 c g
 Pteromalus syntomus Ratzeburg, 1852 c g
 Pteromalus syrphi Dalman, 1820 c g
 Pteromalus tananarivensis Risbec, 1952 c g
 Pteromalus temporalis (Graham, 1969) c g
 Pteromalus terebrans Forster, 1841 g
 Pteromalus tereus Walker, 1839 c g
 Pteromalus tessellatus Ratzeburg, 1852 c g
 Pteromalus tethys Gijswijt, 1999 c g
 Pteromalus tibialis Nees, 1834 c g
 Pteromalus tibiellus Zetterstedt, 1838 c g
 Pteromalus tiburtus Walker, 1839 c g
 Pteromalus timidus Dalla Torre, 1898 c g
 Pteromalus tortricis (Schrank, 1781) c g
 Pteromalus townsendi (Crawford, 1912) c g
 Pteromalus toxeus Walker, 1843 c g
 Pteromalus tricollis Forster, 1841 g
 Pteromalus tripolii (Graham, 1969) c g
 Pteromalus troglodytes Dalla Torre, 1898 c g
 Pteromalus unca Walker, 1839 c g
 Pteromalus unicolor Forster, 1841 g
 Pteromalus vaginatus Forster, 1841 g
 Pteromalus vaginulae Ratzeburg, 1852 c g
 Pteromalus vallatus Forster, 1841 g
 Pteromalus vallecula Ratzeburg, 1848 c g
 Pteromalus vanessae Howard, 1889 c g
 Pteromalus varians (Spinola, 1808) c g
 Pteromalus variolosus Forster, 1841 g
 Pteromalus vectensis Cockerell, 1921 c g
 Pteromalus velox Forster, 1841 g
 Pteromalus veneris Dalla Torre, 1898 c g
 Pteromalus ventricosus Forster, 1841 g
 Pteromalus venustus Statz, 1938 c g
 Pteromalus verticalis Forster, 1841 g
 Pteromalus vibulenus (Walker, 1839) c g
 Pteromalus vicarius Ratzeburg, 1852 c g
 Pteromalus vicinus Forster, 1841 g
 Pteromalus villosae Gijswijt, 1999 c g
 Pteromalus violarum Dalla Torre, 1898 c g
 Pteromalus viridicans Forster, 1841 g
 Pteromalus vitula Walker, 1843 c g
 Pteromalus vopiscus Walker, 1839 c g
 Pteromalus vorax Forster, 1841 g
 Pteromalus vulgaris (Ashmead, 1894) c g
 Pteromalus vulso Walker, 1839 c g

Data sources: i = ITIS, c = Catalogue of Life, g = GBIF, b = Bugguide.net

References

Pteromalus